Hilles is a surname. There are 33,000 records of people with the surname Hilles. Notable people with the surname include:

Charles D. Hilles, politician from Ohio, chairman of the Republican National Committee
Florence Bayard Hilles (1865–1954), American suffragist
Robert Hilles, Canadian poet and novelist
Hilles clan, Palestinian extended family

References